Naram-Sin, also transcribed Narām-Sîn or Naram-Suen (: DNa-ra-am DSîn, meaning "Beloved of the Moon God Sîn", the "𒀭" being a silent honorific for "Divine"), was a ruler of the Akkadian Empire, who reigned c. 2254–2218 BC (middle chronology), and was the third successor and grandson of King Sargon of Akkad. Under Naram-Sin the empire reached its maximum strength. He was the first Mesopotamian king known to have claimed divinity for himself, taking the title "God of Akkad", and the first to claim the title "King of the Four Quarters, King of the Universe". As part of that he became city god of Akkade in the same way Enlil was city god of Nippur.

Biography 
Naram-Sin was born as a son of Manishtushu. He was thus a nephew of King Rimush and grandson of Sargon and Tashlultum. Naram-Sin's aunt was the High Priestess En-hedu-ana. To be fully correct, rather than Naram-Sin or Naram-Suen "in Old Akkadian, the name in question should rather be reconstructed as Naram-Suyin (more precisely, /narām-tsuyin/) or Naram-Suʾin (/narām-tsuʾin/)".

Reign

Naram-Sin defeated Manium of Magan, and various northern hill tribes in the Zagros, Taurus, and Amanus Mountains, expanding his empire up to the Mediterranean Sea and Armenia. His "Victory Stele" depicts his triumph over Satuni, chief of Lullubi in the Zagros Mountains. The king list gives the length of his reign as 56 years, and at least 20 of his year-names are known, referring to military actions against various places such as Uruk and Subartu. One unknown year was recorded as "the Year when Naram-Sin was victorious against Simurrum in Kirasheniwe and took prisoner Baba the governor of Simurrum, and Dubul the ensi of Arame". Other year names refer to his construction work on temples in Akkad, Nippur, and Zabala. He also built administrative centers at Nagar and Nineveh. At one point in his reign much of the empire, led by Iphur-Kis from the city of Kish rose in rebellion and was put down strongly.

Submission of Sumerian kings
The submission of some Sumerian rulers to Naram-Sin, and in general to the Akkadian Empire, is recorded in the seal inscriptions of Sumerian rulers such as Lugal-ushumgal, governor (ensi) of Lagash ("Shirpula"), circa 2230-2210 BC. Several inscriptions of Lugal-ushumgal are known, particularly seal impressions, which refer to him as governor of Lagash and at the time a vassal (arad, "servant" or "slave") of Naram-Sin, as well as his successor Shar-kali-sharri. One of these seals proclaims:

It can be considered that Lugalushumgal was a collaborator of the Akkadian Empire, as was Meskigal, ruler of Adab. Later however, Lugal-ushumgal was succeeded by Puzer-Mama who, as Akkadian power waned, achieved independence from Shar-Kali-Sharri, assuming the title of "King of Lagash" and starting the illustrious Second Dynasty of Lagash.

Control of Elam
 
Elam had been under the domination of Akkad, at least temporarily, since the time of Sargon. The Elamite king Khita is probably recorded as having signed a peace treaty with Naram-Sin, stating: "The enemy of Naram-Sin is my enemy, the friend of Naram-Sin is my friend". It has been suggested that the formal treaty allowed Naram-Sin to have peace on his eastern borders, so that he could deal more effectively with the threat from Gutium. Further study of the treaty suggests that Khita provided Elamite troops to Naram-Sin, that he married his daughter to the Akkadian king, and that he agreed to set up statues of Naram-Sin in the sanctuaries of Susa. As a matter of fact, it is well known that Naram-Sin had extreme influence over Susa during his reign, building temples and establishing inscriptions in his name, and having the Akkadian language replace Elamite in official documents.

During the rule of Naram-Sin, "military governors of the country of Elam" (shakkanakkus) with typically Akkadian names are known, such as Ili-ishmani or Epirmupi. This suggests that these governors of Elam were officials of the Akkadian Empire.

Conquest of Armanum and Ebla

The conquest of Armanum and Ebla on the Mediterranean coast by Naram-Sin is mentioned in several of his inscriptions:

Nasiriyah stele of Naram-Sin
An alabaster stele representing captives being led by Akkadian soldiers is generally attributed to Narim-Sin on stylistic grounds. In particular, it is considered as more sophisticated graphically than the steles of Sargon of Akkad or those of Rimush. Two fragments are in the National Museum of Iraq, and one in the Boston Museum. The stele is quite fragmentary, but attempts at reconstitution have been made. Depending on sources, the fragments were excavated in Wasit, al-Hay district, Wasit Governorate, or in Nasiriyah, both locations in Iraq.

It is thought that the stele represents the result of the campaigns of Naram-Sin to Cilicia or Anatolia. This is suggested by the characteristics of the booty carried by the soldiers in the stele, especially the metal vessel carried by the main soldier, the design of which is unknown in Mesopotamia, but on the contrary well known in contemporary Anatolia.

The Curse of Akkad

One Mesopotamian myth, a historiographic poem entitled "The curse of Akkad: the Ekur avenged", explains how the empire created by Sargon of Akkad fell and the city of Akkad was destroyed. The myth was written hundreds of years after Naram-Sin's life and is the poet's attempt to explain how the Gutians succeeded in conquering Sumer. After an opening passage describing the glory of Akkad before its destruction, the poem tells of how Naram-Sin angered the chief god Enlil by plundering the Ekur (Enlil's temple in Nippur.) In his rage, Enlil summoned the Gutians down from the hills east of the Tigris, bringing plague, famine and death throughout Mesopotamia. Food prices became vastly inflated, with the poem stating that 1 lamb would buy only half a sila (about 425 ml) of grain, half a sila of oil, or half a mina (about 250g) of wool. To prevent this destruction, eight of the gods (namely Inanna, Enki, Sin, Ninurta, Utu, Ishkur, Nusku, and Nidaba) decreed that the city of Akkad should be destroyed in order to spare the rest of Sumer and cursed it. This is exactly what happens, and the story ends with the poet writing of Akkad's fate, mirroring the words of the gods' curse earlier on:

Its chariot roads grew nothing but the 'wailing plant,
Moreover, on its canalboat towpaths and landings,
No human being walks because of the wild goats, vermin, snakes, and mountain scorpions,
The plains where grew the heart-soothing plants, grew nothing but the 'reed of tears,
Akkad, instead of its sweet-flowing water, there flowed bitter water,
Who said "I would dwell in that" found not a good dwelling place,
Who said "I would lie down in Akkad" found not a good sleeping place.

Gutian Incursions
These Gutian raids were indeed devastating, but it is unknown how badly they affected Sumer. At some point in the Akkadian Period the Gutians established a capital at the city of Adab. Naram-Sin may have passed on his empire to his son Shar-Kali-Sharri more or less intact upon his death in c. 2219 BC, or he may have passed on little more than Akkad itself. The year names of Shar-Kali-Sharri indicate continued control of Nippur and Babylon at least. The Gutians remained there for over 100 years before being replaced by the Ur III state as the dominant political power.

Victory stele

Naram-Sin's Victory Stele depicts him as a god-king (symbolized by his horned helmet) climbing a mountain above his soldiers, and his enemies, the defeated Lullubi led by their king Satuni. Although the stele was broken off at the top when it was stolen and carried off by the Elamite forces of Shutruk-Nakhunte in the 12th century BC, it still strikingly reveals the pride, glory, and divinity of Naram-Sin. The stele seems to break from tradition by using successive diagonal tiers to communicate the story to viewers, however the more traditional horizontal frames are visible on smaller broken pieces. The stele was found at Susa, and is now in the Louvre Museum. A similar bas-relief depicting Naram-Sin was found a few miles north-east of Diarbekr, at Pir Hüseyin.

The inscription over the head of the king is in Akkadian and fragmentary, but reads:

The second inscription, to the right over the mountainous cone, is in Elamite and was written about 1000 years later by king Shutruk-Nahhunte, who stole the stele and brought it to Elam.

Children 
Among the known sons of Naram-Sin were his successor Shar-Kali-Sharri, Nabi-Ulmash, who was governor of Tutub, and a Ukin-Ulmash. Excavations at Tell Mozan (ancient Urkesh) brought to light a sealing of Tar'am-Agade, a previously unknown daughter of Naram-Sin, who was possibly married to an unidentified endan (ruler) of Urkesh. A recently found cylinder seal, looted from Urasagrig, shows that the governor there, Sharatigubishin, was also a son. Other known children include Enmenana, the high priestess at Ur, a son who was governor at Marad, two daughters who were ēntum-priestesses at Sippar and Nippur, Bin-kali-šarrē, Šumšani, Lipit-ilē, Rigmuš-ālsu, Nabi-Ulmaš, Me-Ulmaš, and Ukēn-Ulmaš. One daughter, Tuṭṭanabšum (Tudanapšum), held the position of high priestess of Enlil at Nippur, the most important religious position in the empire. She was also deified, the only female and only non-king to be made a god.

In popular culture 
King Naram-Sin is a character in the 2021 video game House of Ashes, with the main plot occurring in his personal temple. In the game, he is the self-proclaimed "God King" of Akkad, and is engaged in a war with the Gutians after being cursed by the god Enlil; whom he angered after the sacking his temple. Naram-Sin was voiced and motion captured by Sami Karim.

Excavations by Nabonidus circa 550 BC

A foundation deposit of Naram-Sin was discovered and analysed by king Nabonidus, circa 550 BC, who Robert Silverberg thus characterises as the first archaeologist. Not only did he lead the first excavations which were to find the foundation deposits of the temples of Šamaš the sun god, the warrior goddess Anunitu (both located in Sippar), and the sanctuary that Naram-Sin built to the moon god, located in Harran, but he also had them restored to their former glory. He was also the first to date an archaeological artefact in his attempt to date Naram-Sin's temple during his search for it. His estimate was inaccurate by about 1,500 years.

Inscriptions

See also

Bassetki Statue
History of Mesopotamia
Sumerian king list
House of Ashes

References

Sources
Al-Hussainy, Abbas Ali Abbas, "The civilized achievements of the Akkadian king Naram-Sin A Research in his Artistic Remains and The Date Formulas", ISIN Journal 3, 2022
Piotr Michalowski, New Sources concerning the Reign of Naram-Sin,  Journal of Cuneiform Studies, vol. 32, no. 4, pp. 233–246, (Oct., 1980)
H.W.F. Saggs, The Babylonians, Fourth Printing, 1988, Macmillan Publishers Ltd.
J. P. Naab, E. Unger, Die Entdeckung der Stele des Naram-Sin in Pir Hüseyin, Istanbul Asariatika Nesriyati XII (1934).

External links

Victory Stele of Naram-Sin

23rd-century BC kings of Akkad
Deified people
3rd-millennium BC births
3rd-millennium BC deaths
Kings of the Universe
Akkadian Empire